Frank King may refer to:

Sports
Frank King (English cricketer) (1911–1996), English cricketer, played for Cambridge University 1934–35 and Dorset 1937–54
Frank King (West Indian cricketer) (1926–1990), West Indian Test cricketer
Frank King (footballer) (1917–2003), English soccer player
Frank King (ice hockey) (1929-2004), retired ice hockey player
Frank A. King, American football coach

Politics
Frank King (Australian politician) (1912–1981), Australian politician
Frank King (Irish politician), Irish politician
Frank W. King (1912–1988), Democratic leader and member of the Ohio Senate

Military
Frank King (British Army officer) (1919–1998), British Army general
Frank Ragan King (1884–1919), officer in the United States Navy

Other
Frank King (cartoonist) (1883–1969), American cartoonist
Frank King (producer) (1913–1989), film producer